Xavier "Xevi" Pons Puigdillers (born 21 January 1980) is a Spanish rally driver who competed in the World Rally Championship from 2003 to 2014.

Career
Pons started his racing career on motorcycles and won the Spanish enduro national championship in 1998. That same year, he competed with the Spanish junior team at the International Six Days Enduro and won the Junior World Trophy. He was part of the victorious Spanish team again in 2000. He continued riding in the Spanish enduro championship and was the runner-up in 2000 and 2001, also achieving success in the European and the World Enduro Championship.

In 2002, Pons switched to rallying, capturing the Spanish national Group N gravel title the following year. In the national asphalt championship, he finished second. He also debuted in the World Rally Championship at the 2003 Swedish Rally. In 2004, Pons competed in both the Junior World Rally Championship and the Production World Rally Championship. In the production car championship, he took two wins and finished fourth overall in the standings. In the junior class, he was ninth overall, with best placement being third at the Acropolis Rally. He also scored his first points in the World Rally Championship by finishing sixth at the Rally Australia.

Pons' 2005 season included 11 rallies with a World Rally Car and four with a production class rally car. Driving a Peugeot 206 WRC and a Citroën Xsara WRC, he finished in the points twice. His best result was fourth, at the Rally Catalunya. Seven points resulted in a 16th place in the overall championship.

For the 2006 season, Pons signed up for a full WRC season with Kronos Total Citroën, partnering the two-time World Rally Champion Sébastien Loeb. By the ninth event of the season, Rallye Deutschland, he had gathered only 11 points so the team decided to replace him with Dani Sordo as the second driver to collect manufacturers' points. Pons still failed to impress the team, and when Loeb was injured and could not compete at the Rally of Turkey, Kronos hired Colin McRae to stand in. However, at Turkey, Pons finished fourth. He was then promoted to Kronos' second seat again and he went on to finish fourth in Australia and New Zealand and fifth in the final race of the season; the Wales Rally Great Britain. With 32 points, he placed seventh overall in the championship.

Pons' best result in a world rally remains fourth, which he has achieved five times: In 2005 at the Rally Catalunya, and in 2006 at the Rally d'Italia Sardegna, Rally of Turkey, Rally Australia and Rally New Zealand.

After failing to land a drive in a competitive team for the 2007 season, Pons announced that he will be withdrawing from competing in the WRC. However, he vowed to stay in shape, should an opportunity arise for 2008 or for the later 2007 season. The opportunity soon came halfway through the 2007 season as the Subaru World Rally Team signed on Xevi Pons to drive a third car on the remaining events on the 2007 schedule, and contest a full schedule for Subaru in 2008 with an option for Subaru to keep his services in 2009. Despite this, Pons never did return to the Subaru for 2008. Instead, he competed on Spanish national rallies.

In 2010, Pons returned to the WRC in the newly formed SWRC class, driving a Ford Fiesta S2000 for the Nupel Global Racing team.
He won his debut S2000 event in Rally Mexico. Pons also won second S2000 event in row by winning in Jordania. In both occasions, he also finished on WRC points. Pons finally won the Super 2000 World Rally Championship in 2010.

Complete WRC results

JWRC results

PWRC results

† Did not score points at the 2004 Rally Australia.

SWRC results

Notes

References

External links
 Official website
 ewrc profile

1980 births
Living people
Catalan rally drivers
Spanish rally drivers
World Rally Championship drivers
Dakar Rally drivers
Spanish motorcycle racers
Motorcycle racers from Catalonia
Enduro riders